The red-billed oxpecker (Buphagus erythrorynchus) is a passerine bird in the oxpecker family, Buphagidae. It is native to the savannah of sub-Saharan Africa, from the Central African Republic east to South Sudan and south to northern and eastern South Africa. Its range overlaps that of the less widespread yellow-billed oxpecker.

Distribution 
The red-billed oxpecker is a native of the savanna of sub-Saharan Africa. It ranges across Ethiopia and Somalia through Kenya, Tanzania, Malawi, and Zambia to southern Africa, Botswana, Zimbabwe, southern Mozambique, and north-eastern South Africa.

Description 
A juvenile oxpecker is darker brown than its parents. Its bill is dark olive at first, but gradually takes on adult colouration after four months. Its flight is strong and direct, and their call is a hissy crackling trik-quisss.

Behaviour 

The red-billed oxpecker nests in tree holes lined with hair plucked from livestock. It lays 2–5 eggs, with three being the average. Outside the breeding season it forms large, chattering flocks.

The preferred habitat is open country, and the red-billed oxpecker eats insects. Both the English and scientific names arise from this species' habit of perching on large wild and domesticated mammals such as cattle and eating ticks.   
This species's relationship with rhinos gives the Swahili name Askari wa kifaru meaning "the rhino's guard".

An adult will take nearly 100 blood-engorged female Rhipicephalus (Boophilus) decoloratus ticks, or more than 12,000 larvae in a day. However, their preferred food is blood, and while they may take ticks bloated with blood, they also feed on it directly, pecking at the mammal's wounds to keep them open.

Field observations in rhinos have shown oxpeckers warning the nearsighted rhino from danger.

References

Further reading

External links

 Red-billed oxpecker – Species text in The Atlas of Southern African Birds.
 Red-billed oxpecker videos, photos & sounds on the Macaulay Library

red-billed oxpecker
Birds of East Africa
red-billed oxpecker